Sagada, officially the Municipality of Sagada is a 5th class municipality in the province of Mountain Province, Philippines. According to the 2020 census, it has a population of 11,510 people.
 

Sagada is famous for its hanging coffins. This is a traditional way of burying people that is still utilized. The elderly carve their own coffins out of hollowed logs. If they are too weak or ill, their families prepare their coffins instead. The dead are placed inside their coffins (sometimes breaking their bones in the process of fitting them in), and the coffins are brought to a cave for burial. The Sagada people have been practicing such burials for over 2,000 years however not everyone is qualified to be buried this way; among other things, one had to have been married and had grandchildren.

Popular activities include trekking, exploring both caves and waterfalls, spelunking, bonfires, picnics, rappelling, visiting historical sites, nature hikes, and participating in tribal celebrations. Guides can be found upon registration at the tourist-office in Sagada Proper (the main town) for a small fee. Most of the guides are natives, also known as Kankanaey.

History

Origin legend 

According to legend, Sagada was founded as an ili or village by Biag, a man from Bika in eastern Abra. The people from Bika were forced out of their ili by raiding headhunters. Biag's family resettled in Candon, Ilocos but when baptism or the giving of names was enforced, Biag's family chose to move back toward the mountains in search for a settlement. Along the way, he and his siblings decided to part ways. A brother, Balay, chose to return to Candon, a sister to Abra. Another brother settled along the upper Abra River. Biag pushed further to the east until he came to what is now Sagada.

Arrival of Anglican missionaries 
Perhaps for lack of transportation and willing guides, few conquistadors set foot in Sagada during the Spanish Era, and a Spanish Mission was not founded until 1882. As a result, it is one of a few places in the Philippines that has preserved its indigenous culture with little Spanish influence.

Anglican missionaries led by Rev. Fr. John Staunton built the Church of Saint Mary the Virgin and founded St. Mary's School, Sagada in 1904.

Chico River Dam Project 
Sagada was one of several municipalities in Mountain Province which would have been flooded by the Chico River Dam Project during the Marcos dictatorship, alongside Bauko, Bontoc, Sabangan, Sadanga, and parts of Barlig.  However, the indigenous peoples of Kalinga Province and Mountain Province resisted the project and when hostilities resulted in the murder of Macli-ing Dulag, the project became unpopular and was abandoned before Marcos was ousted by the 1986 People Power Revolution.

Geography
Sagada is nestled in a valley at the upper end of the Malitep tributary of the Chico River some one and a half kilometers above sea level in the Central Cordillera Mountains, enveloped between the main Cordillera Ranges and the Ilocos Range. Mount Data in the south and Mount Kalawitan in the southeast pierce the horizon. Mount Polis, Bessang and Mount Tirad in the east, and Mount Sisipitan in the north mark the Mountain Province–Abra boundary. There are limestone mountains throughout Sagada. This part of Luzon used to be submerged in the ocean tens of millions of years ago, and fossilized seashells can be found in the walls of Sumaguing Cave.

Climate

Under the Köppen climate classification, Sagada features a subtropical highland climate (‘’Cwb’’). The area averages 2,835 mm of precipitation annually, the bulk of which falls between the months of May and October. Temperatures are relatively consistent throughout the course with average daily temperatures ranging from around 17 to 20 degrees Celsius.

Barangays
Sagada is politically subdivided into 19 barangays.  These barangays are headed by elected officials: Barangay Captain, Barangay Council, whose members are called Barangay Councilors. All are elected every three years.

 Aguid
 Ambasing
 Angkileng
 Antadao
 Balugan
 Bangaan
 Dagdag
 Demang
 Fidelisan
 Kilong
 Madongo
 Patay (Poblacion)
 Pide
 Nacagang
 Suyo
 Taccong
 Tanulong
 Tetep-an Norte
 Tetep-an Sur

Demographics

Religion

Seeing that the Roman Catholicism in the Philippines has long been established, missionary Charles Henry Brent mentioned that "we are not building an altar over and against another altar," thus focusing Episcopal missionary activity among the Filipino-Chinese in Manila, the tribes in Mindanao and the tribes of northern Luzon. Since the coming of missionaries from the Protestant Episcopal Church in the United States, the municipality of Sagada has become the only Philippine town that is predominantly Anglican with almost 95% baptised into the Episcopal Church of the Philippines (ECP). A known landmark at the centre of town is the Church of St. Mary the Virgin, a vibrant Episcopal parish. In 2004, the ECP celebrated its centennial with much of the festivities centered on the town of Sagada.

Economy 

Since the climate is similar to those of Benguet, its crops are likewise temperate products such as cabbage, tomatoes, green pepper, potatoes, carrots, beans, and others. Between 1882 and 1896, the Spanish colonizers introduced Arabica coffee: a source of income since the American occupation. Citrus, mainly lemon, lime and Valencia oranges were introduced from Spain by Jaime Masferre to provide the needs of American missionaries and employees of the Mission of Saint Mary the Virgin. During the American Period, the Americans introduced products like strawberries, and peaches due to its cooler, highland rainforest climate.

In recent years, tourism has also grown to contribute significantly to the local economy. Inns, restaurants, tour guide services, and other tourism-related industries have also grown rapidly. The municipal government also collects significant amounts through the environmental fee it charges each tourist, as well as through the taxes levied on local businesses.

Government
Sagada, belonging to the lone congressional district of the province of Mountain Province, is governed by a mayor designated as its local chief executive and by a municipal council as its legislative body in accordance with the Local Government Code. The mayor, vice mayor, and the councilors are elected directly by the people through an election which is being held every three years.

Elected officials

Members of the Municipal Council (2019–2022):
 Congressman: Maximo Y. Dalog Jr.
 Mayor: James B. Pooten Jr.
 Vice-Mayor: Felicito O. Dula
 Councilors:
 Paul S. Domoguen
 Banjamin G. Capuyan
 Fermin S. Lumbaya
 Dave A. Gulian
 David A. Beleo Jr.
 David Tallusen B. Buyagan
 Kapon Batollog
 Ezra C. Wadingan

Places of interest
Sagada has many natural wonders, including:

 Sumaguing and Lumiang Caves
 Bomod-ok and Bokong Falls
 Rice terraces
 Echo Valley
 Kiltepan Tower
 Underground River
 Lake Danum
 Hanging Coffins
 Pongas Falls
 Mount Ampacao
 Marlboro Hill
 Fortune Express 
 Latang and Matang Caves

Other notable places include:
 The Church of St. Mary the Virgin
 The gravesite of Philippine History scholar William Henry Scott

Notable personalities 
 Eduardo Masferré -  Filipino-Catalan photographer regarded as the Father of Philippine photography.
 William Henry Scott - Historian and Episcopalian missionary best known for numerous books on the Cordilleran peoples and on Precolonial Philippines.

Trivia
 Sagada was featured in the Filipino film, Don't Give Up on Us, and That Thing Called Tadhana.
 Sagada was featured in an episode of Locked Up Abroad.
 In the "Death" episode of The Moaning of Life, Karl Pilkington visits Sagada to see a local communitys cliffside burial techniques.

Gallery

References

External links

[ Philippine Standard Geographic Code]
Philippine Census Information
Philippine Center for Investigative Journalism on Sagada

Mountain resorts in the Philippines
Municipalities of Mountain Province